Sēja Municipality is a former municipality in Vidzeme, Latvia. The municipality was formed in 2006 by reorganization of Sēja Parish; the administrative centre being Loja. The population in 2020 was 2,156.

On 1 July 2021, Sēja Municipality ceased to exist and its territory was merged into Saulkrasti Municipality.

See also 
 Administrative divisions of Latvia (2009)

References 

 
Former municipalities of Latvia